The Sheriff of Kolkata is an apolitical titular position of authority bestowed for one year on a prominent citizen of Kolkata (Calcutta). The Sheriff has an office and staff in Calcutta High Court but does not have executive powers. Mumbai (Bombay) and Kolkata are the only cities in India to maintain the post of Sheriff. Presently the office of the Sheriff is situated in the Calcutta High Court building.

History
The Calcutta Madness was established by a Royal Charter issued by King George III of Great Britain on 26 March 1774 which created the Supreme Court at Fort William in Calcutta. The charter stipulated that the sheriff would be appointed by the Governor-General in Council from a list of three residents recommended by the Supreme Court in a similar manner to the system of High Sheriffs in England.

In the early years the Sheriff of Calcutta was the executive arm of the judiciary and responsible for the provision of jurors, the safe custody of prisoners and the seizure of goods. From the mid 1800s, the power of the position was gradually reduced until it became today's ceremonial post.

The Calcutta Sheriff's Act 1948 (or West Bengal Act XXX of 1948) was enacted on 15 October 1948.

Notable persons
List of sheriffs:

 1775: James Macrabey, first Sheriff
 1778: John Richardson
 1779: Sir John Hadley D'Oyly, Bt
 1840: David Hare 
 1846: James McKilligin 
 1866: Seth Arratoon Apcar, first non-European Sheriff
 1873: Manekji Rustamji, the first Indian Sheriff
 1874: Raja Digambar Mitra, politician, writer and first Bengali Sheriff
 1886: George Yule, merchant
 1888: Mahendralal Sarkar, doctor and academic
 1892: James Mackay, 1st Earl of Inchcape
 1893: Rustamjee Dhanjibhai Mehta
 1901: Sir George Henry Sutherland
 1904: Nalin Behari Sircar
 1905: Baron Cable, British merchant
 1908: Sir George Henry Sutherland (2nd term)
 1911: Rajendra Nath Mukharji, industrialist
 1920: Alfred Pickford, merchant
 1935: Abdul Halim Khan Ghuznavi
 1936: Sir Charles Gordon Arthur
1950: Dr Shanti Bhusan Dutt Gupta 
 1955: Dr Amulya Chandra Ukil, physician
 1957, 1958: Shri Suresh Chandra Roy
 1968: Ramesh Chandra Majumdar, historian
 1987: KSB Sanyal, business leader (Chairman of Andrew Yule)
 1989: Dr Saroj Gupta, oncologist
 1991: Dr. K.K.H. Siddiqui, cardiologist
 1992: Dr. Sanat Kumar Biswas, scientist
 1994: Basanta Choudhury, film actor
 1998: Dr I. S. Roy, Ophthalmologist
 1999: Dr Surendra Kumar Sharma, radiologist
 2000: Pankaj Lal Roy, cricketer
 2001: Smt. Suchitra Mitra, the first women Sheriff
 2002: Sunil Gangopadhyay, Bengali poet
 2003: Prabir Roy, film producer 
 2004: Dr Sadhan Chandra Ray
 2005: Chuni Goswami, sportsman
 2006: Prof. Amal Chakraborty, pediatrician
 2007: Rathindra Nath Dutta
 2008: Dr Dulal Kumar Basu 
 2009: Santo Jyoti Mittra 
 2010: Utpal Chatterjee, journalist, professor of IISWBM
 2011: Indrajit Roy, neurosurgeon
 2012: Vacant
 2013: Dr. Swapankumar Ghosh, physician
 2014: Ranjit Mallick, actor 
 2015: Vacant
 2017: Dr. Sanjay Chattopadhyay, physician
 2019: Mani Shankar Mukherjee, writer

See also
 Sheriff of Mumbai
 Sheriff of Madras

References

Government of Kolkata
Sheriffs of Kolkata